Peter Duncan McCallum (August 26, 1853 – ) was an Ontario farmer and political figure. He represented Lambton East in the Legislative Assembly of Ontario as a Conservative-Protestant Protective Association member from 1893 to 1898.

He was born in Erin, Canada West in 1853, the son of Peter McCallum. He served as reeve of Bosanquet Township and as warden for Lambton County. In 1878, he married Ann Christena Vivian. McCallum was first elected to the provincial assembly in an 1893 by-election held after the death of Hugh McKenzie. He served as Inspector of Liquor Licenses in East Lambton from 1906 to 1916 and then as assistant Inspector for Lambton County.

External links 
The Canadian parliamentary companion, 1897 JA Gemmill

Lambton County's Hundred Years, 1849 - 1949, V Lauriston (1949)

1853 births
Progressive Conservative Party of Ontario MPPs
Protestant Protective Association MPPs
Year of death missing